Ottoman military reforms began in the late 18th century.

Reforms of Selim III 

When Selim III came to the throne in 1789, an ambitious effort of military reform was launched, geared towards securing the Ottoman Empire. The sultan and those who surrounded him were conservative and desired to preserve the status quo. No one in power in the Empire had any interest in social transformation. Selim III in 1789 to 1807 set up the "Nizam-i Cedid" [new order] army to replace the inefficient and outmoded imperial army. The old system depended on Janissaries, who had largely lost their military effectiveness. Selim closely followed Western military forms. It would be expensive for a new army, so a new treasury ['Irad-i Cedid'] had to be established. The result was the Porte now had an efficient, European-trained army equipped with modern weapons. However it had fewer than 10,000 soldiers in an era when Western armies were ten to fifty times larger. Furthermore, the Sultan was upsetting the well-established traditional political powers. As a result it was rarely used, apart from its use against Napoléon's expeditionary force at Gaza and Rosetta. The new army was dissolved by reactionary elements with the overthrow of Selim in 1807, but it became the model of the new Ottoman Army created later in the 19th century.

Introduction of advisors 

Western military advisors were imported as advisors but their abilities to enact change were limited.  A parade of French officers were brought in, and none of them could do a great deal.  One example of an advisor who achieved limited success was the François Baron de Tott, a French officer.  He did succeed in having a new foundry built to make artillery.  As well he directed the construction of a new naval base.  Unfortunately it was almost impossible for him to divert soldiers from the regular army into the new units.  The new ships and guns that made it into service were too few to have much of an influence on the Ottoman army and de Tott returned home. He was succeeded by a Scot known as Ingiliz Mustafa.

When they had requested French help, General Napoleon Bonaparte was to be sent to Constantinople in 1795 to help organize Ottoman artillery. He did not go, for just days before he was to embark for the Near East he proved himself useful to the Directory by putting down a Parisian mob in the whiff of grapeshot and was kept in France.

New Army System 

The most important change was the creation of an elite new infantry unit; the Nizam-i Djedid was set up with western uniforms, weapons, and training.  This group would offend the Janissaries. Once elite forces, the Janissaries had become a conservative elite using their military power to advance themselves commercially and politically. In 1806 the Janissaries, with support of the ulema and the provincial governors, revolted against the Sultan and his new force and replaced him with Mustafa IV.

Reforms of Mahmud II 

In 1808 Mustafa IV was replaced by Mahmud II with martial law of Alemdar Mustafa Pasha who restarted the reform efforts.  His first task was to ally with the Janissaries in order to break the power of the provincial governors.  He then turned on the Janissaries, massacring them in their barracks in Istanbul and the provincial capitals in 1826, which is known as the Auspicious Incident. The Sultan now set himself to replace the Janissaries by other regular troops. The Russo-Turkish War of 1828–1829 did not give him time to organize a new army, and the Sultan was forced to fight with these young and undisciplined recruits against the veterans of the Tsar. The war was brought to a close by the disastrous Treaty of Adrianople. While the reforms in question were mainly implemented to improve the military, the most notable development that arose out of these efforts was a series of schools teaching everything from math to medicine to train new officers.

Reforms of Abdulmejid I 

Sultan Abdulmejid I enjoyed several years of peace, which enabled him to form a powerful and well disciplined army that was established at the beginning of the year 1842.

The chain-of-command in the general staff of each army was composed of a commander-in-chief, two lieutenant-generals, three brigadiers of infantry, one of whom commands the reserve, two brigadiers of cavalry, and one brigadier of artillery. In each corps there were three regiments of infantry, two of cavalry, and one of artillery, with thirty-three guns. The total strength of these twelve regiments of active forces was 30,000 men, but it was diminished in time of peace by furlough to an effective strength of about 25,000 men in three of the six armies, as well as 15,000 troops in the other three, a consequence of the recruiting system being as yet incomplete in its application all over the Ottoman Empire. The whole establishment of this branch amounts, therefore, to 180,000 men, belonging to the active service, but its effective strength is at present 123,000.

The reserve of four of the six armies consisted of eleven regiments, six of which were infantry, four of cavalry, and one of artillery.  The total combined force equalled 12,000 troops, while the other two armies have not met their reserve of soldiers who have served five years. In time of war, however, the reserve would form two corps of 25,000 men in each army; giving a total of 300,000. The two services, therefore, as they stood, formed an effective force of 135,000 men; and when their full strength shall have been filled up it will amount to 480,000.

Besides these six armies there were four detached corps.  These corps raise the effective strength of the standing army to 365,000 men.

Deployment at the time consisted of the following:

the Island of Crete was assigned three regiments of infantry and one of cavalry, in all 11,000 men;
the Pashalik of Tripoli in Africa was assigned one regiment of infantry and one of cavalry, about 5,000 strong;
the Pashalik of Tunis was assigned one regiment of infantry and one of cavalry, about 5,000 strong.

Aside from deployed troops, the Ottoman military also had the following units:

the central artillery corps,
a standing brigade of sappers and miners with engineer officers,
the veteran artillery brigade,
permanent artillery garrisons of the fortresses on
The Hellespont,
The Bosphorus,
The Danube, in Serbia, on the Adriatic,
The coast of Asia Minor, in the islands of the Archipelago,
the southern shores of the Black Sea, constituting a combined force of approximately 9,000 troops.

Besides augmentation of 32,000 men by the submission of Bosnia and Northern Albania to the new system; and a further increase of 40,000 men, which Serbia had arranged to furnish, 18,000 men served in Egypt, which would act to reinforce the reserve of the fifth army.

The marines, sailors, and workmen, enrolled in brigades that amounted to 34,000 total men.  The grand total of armed men at the disposal of Ottoman Empire at the time could be calculated at no less than 664,000 men.  In addition, the Ottomans could call-up occasional levies, which were more easily and efficiently utilized in the Ottoman Empire than in any other country at the time. After years of peace and stability the modernized army was put to test in the Crimean War.

Reforms of Abdul Hamid II 

Abdul Hamid II attached utmost importance to the reorganization of the military. As early as 1880 he sought, and two years later secured, German assistance, which culminated in the appointment of Lt. Col. Kohler and, finally, Colmar Von der Goltz as military advisors.

The curriculum of Harbiye (War College) was specialized further to train staff officers in the European style. The school’s name was changed to Mekteb-i Fununu Harb (School of War Science). It was during his reign that the officers’ training was upgraded and regularized, starting with the mid-level military rt2diye and idadi schools and culminating in the Mekteb-i Harbiye (War College) or, for the most capable, in the Erkan-i Harbiye (Chiefs of Staff). The last, as a concept and an organization, was largely the work of von der Goltz.

However, although the consensus that Abdulhamid favoured the modernization of the Ottoman army and the professionalization of the officer corps was fairly general, it seems that he neglected the military during the last fifteen years of his reign, and he also cut down the military budget. The problem with the army (numbering Ca. 700,000 at the end of the century), besides the officers’ constant opposition to field exercises, was the growing number of underpaid officers, and the lack of a proper retirement system. The annual army expenditures were some 7,756,000 liras out of a total national budget of 18,927,000 liras for 1897; when the Debt Administration claimed 6,483.000 liras, little was left for investment in economic development.

Notes

See also

 Military of the Ottoman Empire
 Ottoman Empire
 Auspicious Incident

Military history of the Ottoman Empire
Military reforms
Reform in the Ottoman Empire
Mahmud II